Atrephes is a genus of moths of the family Noctuidae. The genus was erected by E. Dukinfield Jones in 1908.

Species
Atrephes albiluna Hampson, 1908 Brazil (Rio Grande do Sul)
Atrephes phocea Jones, 1908 Brazil (Paraná)

References

External links
Original description: Transactions of the Entomological Society of London 1908.

Acronictinae